Spider Island is an uninhabited island in Lake Michigan. It is located in Ellison Bay, in the town of Liberty Grove, Wisconsin. The Gravel Island National Wildlife Refuge is made up of Spider Island, and nearby Gravel Island. At  it is the larger of the two islands.

References

External links 
 Spider Island, Web-Map of Door County, Wisconsin

Islands of Door County, Wisconsin
Lake islands of Wisconsin
Islands of Lake Michigan in Wisconsin
Uninhabited islands of Wisconsin